Dame Menna Frances Rawlings  (née Hornung; born ) is a British diplomat serving as British Ambassador to France since 2021. Previously British High Commissioner to Australia from 2015 to 2019, she then served as Director General of Economic and Global Issues at the Foreign and Commonwealth Office  from 2019 to 2020.

Career 
Menna Hornung read International Relations at LSE, graduating with a Bachelor of Science degree, before joining the Foreign and Commonwealth Office in 1989. In her early career, she served in London, as well as Brussels, Nairobi and Tel Aviv.

From 2002 to 2004, she served as private secretary to the Permanent Under-Secretary of State for Foreign Affairs, then until 2008 she was posted as deputy high commissioner to Ghana at Accra. After three years in Washington, D.C. as HM Consul General, in 2011 she was posted back to the FCO in London as director for human resources, remaining there until 2014. From 2015 to 2018 she served as British High Commissioner to Australia, before again returning to London in 2019, being promoted to Director General of Economic and Global Issues at the Foreign and Commonwealth Office. She served in the role until 2020. 

In April 2021, the Government nominated Rawlings for the role of British Ambassador to France, to take office in summer 2021. News of her appointment coincided with reporting that for the first time, every British ambassador or high commissioner to a G7 country would be a woman. She entered the role on 23 August 2021.

Already Companion of the Order of St Michael and St George (CMG), she was appointed Dame Commander of the Order of St Michael and St George (DCMG) in the 2022 New Year Honours for services to British foreign policy.

See also
 British Embassy in Paris

References 

1967 births
Living people
People from the London Borough of Hillingdon
Alumni of the London School of Economics
British women ambassadors
High Commissioners of the United Kingdom to Australia
Ambassadors of the United Kingdom to France
Dames Commander of the Order of St Michael and St George